Kaurilands is a suburb of West Auckland, which is under the local governance of Auckland Council. The area was subdivided and developed in the 1920s.

Geography

Kaurilands is located in the Waitākere Ranges foothills north of Titirangi, in the upper catchment of the Waikumete Stream, which flows north through the suburb. Kaurlands forms a part of the Waitematā-Waitākere foothills ecological zone. Sheltered from the Tasman Sea by the Waitākere Ranges, the area was traditionally dominated by forests of kauri, Phyllocladus trichomanoides (tānekaha or celery pine) and rimu, with abundant nīkau palm and silver fern. The soils are a mix of Miocene Waitākere volcanic soil and Waitemata Group sedimentary rock.

History

The area is within the traditional rohe of Te Kawerau ā Maki, an iwi that traces their ancestry to some of the earliest inhabitants of the Auckland Region. West Auckland was known as Hikurangi, and the upper catchments of Te Wai-o-Pareira / Henderson Creek were known as Ōkaurirahi, a reference to the mature kauri forests of the area.

During the early colonial days of Auckland, much of modern Konini and Kaurilands was owned by Liverpool immigrant Hibernia Smythe, who aggregated 550 acres of land between 1854 and 1857 north of Titirangi. Smythe used the land for wood and logging, as well as farming sheep and cattle. Smythe had a reputation for being miserly, and after passing left his property to his nephew. In 1925, a company named Kaurilands Limited was formed, to administer the land north of Scenic Drive (then Exhibition Drive) in Titirangi. The Kaurilands Estate was subdivided and sold from 1926 onwards. In the early 20th century, Kaurilands was various described as a part of Titirangi or Waikumete (modern Glen Eden).

During the 1920s and 1930s, the area was the site of a large daffodil farm. Kaurilands School was opened in 1954, and the area's first post office was built on Withers Road in 1964.

Demographics

Kaurilands had a population of 3,177 at the 2018 New Zealand census, an increase of 126 people (4.1%) since the 2013 census, and an increase of 207 people (7.0%) since the 2006 census. There were 1,041 households, comprising 1,548 males and 1,629 females, giving a sex ratio of 0.95 males per female. The median age was 37.9 years (compared with 37.4 years nationally), with 729 people (22.9%) aged under 15 years, 531 (16.7%) aged 15 to 29, 1,590 (50.0%) aged 30 to 64, and 324 (10.2%) aged 65 or older.

Ethnicities were 82.3% European/Pākehā, 11.6% Māori, 6.0% Pacific peoples, 12.2% Asian, and 3.3% other ethnicities. People may identify with more than one ethnicity.

The percentage of people born overseas was 27.8, compared with 27.1% nationally.

Although some people chose not to answer the census's question about religious affiliation, 61.2% had no religion, 25.6% were Christian, 0.4% had Māori religious beliefs, 2.0% were Hindu, 1.3% were Muslim, 0.8% were Buddhist and 2.7% had other religions.

Of those at least 15 years old, 843 (34.4%) people had a bachelor's or higher degree, and 276 (11.3%) people had no formal qualifications. The median income was $43,100, compared with $31,800 nationally. 717 people (29.3%) earned over $70,000 compared to 17.2% nationally. The employment status of those at least 15 was that 1,359 (55.5%) people were employed full-time, 393 (16.1%) were part-time, and 66 (2.7%) were unemployed.

Education
Glen Eden Intermediate School is a school for years 7–8 with a roll of  students.

Kaurilands School is a contributing primary school (years 1–6), with a roll of  students. The school was founded in 1955.

Both schools are coeducational. Rolls are as of

Notes

Suburbs of Auckland
Waitākere Ranges Local Board Area
West Auckland, New Zealand